Artie Matthews (November 15, 1888 – October 25, 1958) was an American songwriter, pianist, and ragtime composer.

Artie Matthews was born in Braidwood, Illinois; his family moved to Springfield, Illinois in his youth. He learned to play piano, mostly popular songs and light classics, until he heard ragtime played by a pianist named Banty Morgan about 1905. Matthews was fascinated and immersed himself in ragtime and started playing and writing numbers in the style. In 1908 he moved to the ragtime center of St. Louis, Missouri, which would be one of his bases, frequently alternating with Chicago, Illinois. He worked as a pianist, arranger, and wrote music for local theater productions.

In early 1913 music publisher John Stark heard Matthews and offered him 50 dollars each for any original rags he submitted for publication. Matthews also worked as an arranger for Starks.

In 1916 Artie Matthews moved to Cincinnati, Ohio, where he first worked as a church organist. In 1921 Matthews and his wife Anna Howard founded the Cosmopolitan School of Music, a music school for African Americans, where Matthews taught until his death. Among Matthews students was Frank Foster, who would become the principal arranger for the Count Basie orchestra.

Some rank Artie Matthews with Scott Joplin, Joseph Lamb, and James Scott as one of the finest and most sophisticated ragtime composers. His most famous rags are the "Pastime Rags", numbered 1 to 5, the latter of which was performed at one point by Lu Watters, with the Yerba Buena Jazz Band. His 1912  Baby Seals Blues was one of the first published Blues. His Weary Blues remains a standard by Dixieland and New Orleans jazz bands.

See also
 List of ragtime composers

External links

Dr. Artie Matthews biography with photos on the website of Matthews' son

1888 births
1958 deaths
African-American pianists
Ragtime composers
People from Braidwood, Illinois
People from Springfield, Illinois
American male pianists
20th-century American male musicians
20th-century American pianists
20th-century African-American musicians